Dominic Newman (born 7 November 1996) is a field hockey player from New Zealand, who plays as a midfielder.

Personal life
Dominic Newman was born and raised in Christchurch, New Zealand.

Career

National teams

Under-21
Newman debuted for the New Zealand U-21 team in 2016 at the Junior Oceania Cup held in the Gold Coast. He followed this up with an appearance at the FIH Junior World Cup in Lucknow.

Black Sticks
In 2016, Newman made his official debut for the Black Sticks during the Trans–Tasman Trophy in Auckland.

Following his debut, Newman went on to represent New Zealand throughout 2017, most notably at the Sultan Azlan Shah Cup in Ipoh.

2018 was Newman's most notable year with the national team. In April, he won a silver medal with the side at the Commonwealth Games held in the Gold Coast. He continued representing the Black Sticks in international test matches throughout the year, culminating with an appearance at the FIH World Cup in Bhubaneswar.

Newman has also appeared in the 2019 and 2020–21 editions of the FIH Pro League.

International goals

References

External links
 
 
 
 
 

1996 births
Living people
New Zealand male field hockey players
Male field hockey midfielders
2018 Men's Hockey World Cup players
Commonwealth Games medallists in field hockey
Sportspeople from Christchurch
Field hockey players at the 2018 Commonwealth Games
Commonwealth Games silver medallists for New Zealand
Medallists at the 2018 Commonwealth Games